Julius Amua-Sekyi, popularly known as Shasha Marley is a Roots African Reggae artiste from Ghana. He is noted for songs such as 'Twin City Mafia', I'm not Ashamed of the Gospel, ‘Maata Family’ among others.

Early life 
Shasha Marley was born in Sekondi-Takoradi in the Western Region of Ghana to a father who was a retired educationist and a choirmaster. Between 1979 and 1983, he was a student at St. John's Secondary School in Sekondi where he played with the school's band known as Mathew Chapter 5. Right after Secondary school, he went mainstream and then on went ahead to release several albums.

Career 
During his early days, Shasha Marley speaks of Bob Marley, Burning Spear, Steel Pulse and Jimmy Cliff as his major influences. He released his debut single,

Tell Freedom which became a major hit in Ghana and beyond.Since then he has gone on to release several other songs

Personal life 
Shasha Marley is married with two kids.

Controversy over Maata Family 
Though Shasha Marley was already famous in his home country and abroad, the one song that arguably gave him the most exposure particularly in Ghana was Maata Family. The song, which was released in 2007 had words that suggested flatulence in the Ghanaian parlance. For instance, the tittle Maata, in the Akan dialect means flatulence and people dragged him for using such words in his song. Also, the usage of Maata Tui, Maata Pue and Mataa Fish somewhat gave credence to the meaning of the song. But Shasha Marley has since refuted the claim and explained that the meaning of the song had nothing to do with flatulence, but rather the names of his pals in Papua New Guinea i.e. Maata Tuitui, Maata Pue and Maata Fish.

Discography 
In 1999 Shasha Marley released The album TELL FREEDOM Which had hits, SEEK YE GOOD and NOT
EVIL.
In 2000 he led 15 top Ghanaian Musicians in a collaboration against HIV/AIDS In Africa.  A Song Dubbed STOP AIDS, LOVE LIFE which was released via the sponsorship of Johns Hopkins University In New York.

In 2001 he released ENEMIES ARE NOT JAH.

In 2007, he released about 14 songs on the album LOST AND FOUND. This includes Twin City Mafia, I'm not ashamed of the gospel, Maata Family, So Nyame Mo, Buum Buum-Waa Waa, Shame Politicians, Promise Land, I see no wrong with Jesus, Queen of Queens, Evil Spirits walk Away, Eagerness, Shasha's creed and Will you be my friend.

2020 saw the release of THA DAWN,  On The album FRONTLINE WORKERS APPRECIATION.  An album of 14 Artists from 14 different countries, which was released in support of the Frontline Workers On The island of Hawaii during the wake of COVID-19.

In 2021, Shasha Marley released ENEMIES ARE NOT JAH and GLORIA AKUFFO

2022 also saw the release of his latest single, TRIBUTE TO BURNING SPEAR.

Awards and Nominations 
 
|-

|-
|| 2007  ||| GHANA MUSIC AWARDS (MAATA) || Best Male Vocal Performance and Best Reggae Song of the Year  || 
|-
|| 2010  ||| KORA All Africa Music Awards || Best African Reggae Artiste of The Year || 
|-
|| 2017  ||| DEPARTMENT OF MUSIC EDUCATION... School Of Creative Arts  (UNIVERSITY OF EDUCATION, WINNEBA) || Music Honors || 
|-
|| 2017  ||| ACCRA FM - Nkran Kwanso || Legendary Award Honor || 
|-
|| 2022  ||| 610 MUSIC AWARDS || Lifetime Achievement Honor || 

|}

External links

References

Living people
Ghanaian reggae musicians
People from Sekondi-Takoradi
Year of birth missing (living people)